KKRO (102.7 FM) is a Christian Worship formatted radio station licensed to Red Bluff, California, and serves the Redding, California area. The station is currently owned by Educational Media Foundation and airs the nationally syndicated Air1 network.

References

External links

Air1 radio stations
Red Bluff, California
Radio stations established in 1985
1985 establishments in California
Educational Media Foundation radio stations
KRO